Sweep is a free and open-sourced digital audio editor and live playback tool for Unix-like systems such as Linux and Berkeley Software Distribution (BSD). It is able to handle a variety of sound formats, including MP3,AIFF, WAV, Speex and Ogg Vorbis. Originally developed with the support of Pixar, the most notable feature of Sweep is its stylus-like cursor tool called Scrubby.

Sweep operates on various 8/16/24/32 bit PCM files. Other major formats handled are GSM 6.10, G721, G723, NIST Sphere and DWVW.

See also

 Comparison of free software for audio
 List of Linux audio software

References

External links

 

Free audio editors
Free music software
Audio editing software that uses GTK